This is a list of chordophones used in the Caribbean music area, including the islands of the Caribbean Sea, as well as the musics of Guyana, Suriname, French Guiana, Belize, Garifuna music, and Bermuda.

List

See also
 List of string instruments

Notes

References 

Chordophones
Caribbean chordophones
Guitar family instruments
Chordophones